Adolf Izrailevich Milman (born c. 1886 in Kishinev (Russian Empire); died 15 January 1930 in Paris) was a Russian and French painter.

Biography 
Milman was born into a large Jewish family in Kishinev, where he studied at a commercial school. In the early 1900s the family moved to Moscow, where Milman entered the Moscow School of Painting, Sculpture and Architecture. From 1904 he attended the art studio of Ilya Mashkov, who soon became his good friend. In the same studio the young artist became friends with Robert Falk.

From 1911 he was a member of the review board of the Jack of Diamonds art group. His works were displayed at its group expositions in 1912–1914. In October, 1917 Milman withdrew from the Jack of Diamonds group and joined The World of Art "Mir iskusstva" (Russian: Мир иску́сства) association together with Falk, Aristarkh Lentulov and others.

In 1912–1917 Milman taught in Mashkov's private studio of painting and drawing. The artist became ill with tuberculosis and took treatment in the Crimea annually from 1914. 
 
In 1918 Milman took part in organizing the Fine Arts Department of Narkompros (the People's Commissariat for Education). The same year he moved to Kiev, where P. F. Chelishchev and S. M. Yutkevich were among his art students. 
Later he lived in Sudak in the Crimea. At the same time he contracted sleeping sickness. His only personal exhibition took place in Feodosiya in 1920.
 
From 1921 the artist lived in Paris, where his paintings were repeatedly exhibited for several years (till 1924), however he stopped painting in 1922. In 1920–1922 the Canadian artist Edwin Holgate studied with Milman.  The artist spent last 8 years of his life bedridden and lost the ability to speak. He was buried in the Montparnasse Cemetery.

Gallery

External links 

 "Milman A." artrz.ru
 L'Europe nouvelle (Paris. 1918), 1921/06/25 (N26) p.818; La Chronique des arts et de la curiosité : supplément à la Gazette des beaux-arts, 1921/06/30 (N12), p.95; Gallica BnF

1880s births
1930 deaths
20th-century Russian painters
20th-century French painters
Soviet emigrants to France
20th-century Russian male artists
Russian avant-garde
Russian Jews
Russian Futurist painters
Russian male painters
French male painters
French people of Russian-Jewish descent
Moscow School of Painting, Sculpture and Architecture alumni